Witch smellers, almost always women, were important and powerful people amongst the Zulu and other Bantu-speaking peoples of Southern Africa, responsible for rooting out alleged evil witches in the area, and sometimes responsible for considerable bloodshed themselves. In present-day South Africa, their role has waned and their activities are illegal according to the Witchcraft Suppression Act, 1957.

Work
If it was determined that some misfortune which had befallen the area had been caused by a witch, the chief summoned his people to a great meeting, in which they all sat in a circle, sometimes for four or five days. The witch smellers then took their places in the center.

The witch smellers wore extravagant costumes, usually including animal skins and feathered headdresses, and face paint. Their hair was heavily greased, twisted in complicated designs, and frequently dyed bright red. They often carried assegais and shields, and also a quagga-tail switch, the symbol of their profession.

Ritual
Surrounded by a circle of women and girls who clapped their hands and droned a low, monotonous chant, the rhythm of which changed occasionally with the stamping of feet, the witch smellers proceeded to work themselves up into a frenzy. In this state, they spun, stalked and leapt, eventually touching one or more of the people with their switches, upon which the person was immediately dragged away and killed. All the living things in the accused witch's hut, human and animal, were also killed. Sometimes an entire kraal was exterminated in this way.

In fiction
A notable fictional account of witch smelling features in H. Rider Haggard's novel King Solomon's Mines, in which the loathsome and inhumanly ancient witch smeller Gagool is a principal villain.

In Robert A. Heinlein's science fantasy novella Magic, Inc., main protagonist Archie Fraser consults with Dr. Royce Worthington, an anthropologist and witch smeller in attempt to track down the cause of various strange events troubling his business.

References

Lewis Spence, The Encyclopedia of the Occult, Routledge, London, 1988

Bantu
Zulu culture
African witchcraft
Modern witch hunts